Femi Euba  (born April 1939) is a Nigerian actor, writer, and dramatist, who has published numerous works of drama, theory, and fiction. His work as a theatre practitioner encompasses acting, playwriting, and directing. Among the topics of his plays is Yoruba culture.

Education and career
Born in Lagos, Nigeria, the son Alphaeus Sobiyi Euba and Winifred Remilekun Euba (née Dawodu), Femi Euba studied acting in England at the Rose Bruford College of Speech and Drama, earning a diploma in 1965, after which he appeared in many shows on the London stage, including the 1966 Royal Court Theatre productions of Wole Soyinka's The Lion and the Jewel (as Lakunle the Schoolteacher), and Shakespeare's Macbeth, with the late Sir Alec Guinness as Macbeth and the late Simone Signoret as Lady Macbeth, directed by William Gaskill.

Euba left London in 1970 to study Playwriting and Dramatic Literature at the Yale School of Drama, where his received an MFA in 1973. In 1980–82, he went back to Yale to study, receiving an MA in Afro-American Studies. He then returned to Nigeria, where he worked for some years, and earned a PhD in Literature-in-English at the University of Ife, Nigeria (now Obafemi Awolowo University), in 1986.

Over the years, Euba has taught at different colleges and universities, in Nigeria and the US, including the College of William & Mary in Virginia. Currently the Louise and Kenneth Kinney Professor at Louisiana State University, he has continued to teach playwriting, and dramatic literature, mostly concentrating on the drama and theatre of Africa and of the African diaspora. He is also a consultant in Black Theatre.

Among his many credits as a director are Soyinka's Death and the King's Horseman (2008) and The Trials of Brother Jero (1988); Edouard Glissant's Monsieur Toussaint (1990); August Wilson's Joe Turner's Come and Gone (1994); Shakespeare's The Tempest (2005); Molière's The Learned Ladies (1991); Euripides' Alcestis (2001); Athol Fugard's Sizwe Bansi is Dead (1992–93), Richard Brinsley Sheridan's The Rivals (1996), The African Company Presents Richard III (1998), Henrik Ibsen's Hedda Gabler (1999), Maryse Condé's Tropical Breeze Hotel (2003), Eduardo Machado's Broken Eggs (2009), Stephen Adly Guirgis's Our Lady of 121st Street (2011), Tarell Alvin McCraney's The Brothers Size (2012), and Bruce Norris's Clybourne Park (2013).

Works
"Akibu: a play for television in two parts" in Five African Plays; ed. Cosmo Pieterse. London: Heinemann Educational Books, 1972.
A Riddle of the Palms and Crocodiles (plays), Negro Ensemble Company, 1973.
Archetypes, Imprecators and Victims of Fate: Origins and Developments of Satire in Black Drama, Greenwood Press, 1989, 
The Gulf, Longman, 1991.
"The Eye of Gabriel" (play), in Black Drama, Alexander Street Press, 2002.
"Dionysus of the Holocaust" (play), in Black Drama, Alexander Street Press, 2002.
Poetics of the Creative Process: An Organic Practicum to Playwriting, University Press of America, 2005.
Camwood at Crossroads (novel), Xlibris, 2007.(Self-published)

References

Contemporary Authors Online, Thomson Gale, 2005.

External links
 College of Music & Dramatic Arts, Louisiana State University

20th-century Nigerian male actors
21st-century Nigerian male actors
1941 births
Alumni of Rose Bruford College
College of William & Mary faculty
Living people
Louisiana State University faculty
Male actors from Lagos
Nigerian dramatists and playwrights
Nigerian expatriate academics in the United States
Nigerian expatriates in the United Kingdom
Nigerian male stage actors
Obafemi Awolowo University alumni
Yale School of Drama alumni
Yoruba academics
Yoruba male actors